Gábor István Harangozó (born September 27, 1975, in Budapest) is a Hungarian politician and Member of the European Parliament (MEP) for the Hungarian Socialist Party, part of the Party of European Socialists.

Harangozó spent his childhood years in Szekszárd. After completing his secondary education, he enrolled in the University of West Hungary in 1995, where he received a degree in Agribusiness. He then went on to study European Funds Management at CAH Dronten in the Netherlands. From 2002 he represented the German federal state of Baden-Württemberg in Brussels.

He was elected an MEP in the 2004 general elections, and he was the youngest Hungarian MEP then. In 2010 he became a member of the National Assembly of Hungary.

Personal life
He is married. His wife is Vanda Harangozóné Tuboly. They have two daughters, Sára and Emma and a son, Dávid. His younger brother Tamás Harangozó is also a representative in the Hungarian Parliament.

References

 Biography at the Hungarian Socialist Party Website 
 Profile at the European Parliament Website 

1975 births
Living people
Hungarian Socialist Party politicians
Hungarian Socialist Party MEPs
MEPs for Hungary 2004–2009
Members of the National Assembly of Hungary (2010–2014)
Members of the National Assembly of Hungary (2014–2018)